Shabrang (Persian for "night color") is the second studio album by Dutch-Iranian singer Sevdaliza. It was released on 28 August 2020, by Twisted Elegance. The singer wrote and produced the album, primarily alongside Mucky. The album encompasses art pop, trip hop and alternative R&B.

The album spawned the singles "Darkest Hour", "Oh My God", "Lamp Lady", "Joanna" and "Habibi", as well as "Human Nature", which was originally released as part of Sevdaliza's 2018 extended play The Calling, her previous release. The album cover was shot by Tré Koch.

Upon its release, Shabrang was met with critical acclaim. Critics praised its emotional background, and its "slow-moving beauty".

Background 
On 7 March 2019, Sevdaliza released "Darkest Hour", followed by another single "Martyr" on 11 April. The two were thought to be standalone singles, however "Darkest Hour" would appear on digital copies of Shabrang. She would continue to subtly tease new music and visuals throughout the year.

In February 2020, Sevdaliza revealed that she had been working on her then unannounced sophomore album for the past two years, alongside close and frequent collaborators Mucky, Leon Den Engelsen and Mihai Puscoiu.

Music and lyrics
Compared to her previous trip hop releases, Shabrang witnesses Sevdaliza gracefully moving through different musical styles, from art pop to trip hop as well as some moments of alternative R&B in between. Within this mixture lies a delicately soft milieu nature.

Release 
On 7 March 2019, Sevdaliza released "Darkest Hour", which at its time of release, was believed to be a standalone single.

On 30 January 2020, Sevdaliza released the protest song "Oh My God".

On 10 March, Sevdaliza announced the release of single "Lamp Lady". It was released 18 March.
On 23 May, Sevdaliza announced the release of single "Joanna". A day before its release, Sevdaliza took to her Instagram stories to express her love towards the song, saying, "I wrote the song in 2018 and it's grown to be one of my favorite compositions. "Joanna" was released 27 May, alongside an accompanying music video, directed by Marlou Fernanda & Sevdaliza.

Sevdaliza announced Shabrang on 30 July. In a statement about the album, Sevdaliza said:

The song "Rhode" was made available to listen early the same day as the album's announcement, exclusively on the streaming platform Apple Music or if the album was pre-ordered on Apple Music.

On 19 August, Sevdaliza released the single "Habibi", and announced an upcoming accompanying music video for the single. The music video was released 26 August and is directed by the "creative directing duo", sevda+ana, which consists of Sevdaliza and Russian filmmaker Anastasia Konovalova. The duo also plan to direct visuals separate from Sevdaliza's work.

Audio and music publication MusicNGear listed Shabrang as one of the best albums from 2020, stating that "the songs have a poetic and parable-esque quality to them - creating a chilling and alluring soundscape."

Track listing 
All tracks written by Sevdaliza; all tracks produced by Sevdaliza and Mucky.

Notes
 "Darkest Hour" does not appear on physical editions of the album.
 "Gole Bi Goldoon" is a cover of "Gole Bee Goldoon", performed by Googoosh.
 "Human Nature" has been updated since its original release on the 2018 extended play The Calling. It is 53 seconds shorter in length and features new string sections.

Personnel 
Credits adapted from album's liner notes.

 Composed by: Sevdaliza, Mucky, Leon Den Engelsen, Mihai Puscoiu, Joel Dieleman, Raven Aartsen, Ludowic
 Mixed by: Sevdaliza and Mucky
 Mastered by: Mucky

Charts

Release history

References 

2020 albums
Sevdaliza albums